Eleme is a language spoken by Eleme people in the Niger Delta Region of Nigeria. Eleme language was originally divided into two mutual dialects of Nchia and Odido. Nchia spoken in six communities of Agbonchia, Akpajo, Alesa, Aleto, Alode and Ogale, while Odido dialect was spoken at Ebubu, Ekporo, Eteo and Onne, today, both dialects have submerged, with a few varying pronunciations.

A unique feature of Eleme is that it uses reduplication to negate verbs.

Writing System

Nasal vowels are indicated with a tilde .

References

Works cited
 

Indigenous languages of Rivers State
Ogoni languages